Dicranella is a genus of moss belonging to the family Dicranaceae. The genus was first described by Karl Müller. It has a cosmopolitan distribution.

Dicranella heteromalla is found to have a satisfactory holotype. Dicranella heteromalla possesses an structured designed to endure acidic environments. In addition, it has multipurpose systems that allow a satisfactory adaption. For example, the wild rhizoid system of D. heteromalla forms a dense, matted network of filaments of different diameters, which evidences that its major role is solute uptake rather than anchorage.

Species:
 Dicranella acroclada Cardot, 1915
 Dicranella heteromalla (Hedw.) Schimp
 Dicranella lorentzii (previously known as Aongstroemia lorentzi)
 Dicranella staphylina Whitehouse, 1965
 Dicranella varia

References

Dicranales
Moss genera